Alexey, Alexei, Alexie, Aleksei, or Aleksey is a Russian and Bulgarian male first name deriving from the Greek Aléxios, meaning "Defender", and thus of the same origin as the Latin Alexius. 

Alexey may also be romanized as Aleksei, Aleksey, Alexej, Aleksej, etc. It has been commonly westernized as Alexis.

Similar Ukrainian and Belarusian names are romanized as Oleksii (Олексій) and Aliaksiej (Аляксей), respectively.

The Russian Orthodox Church uses the Old Church Slavonic version, Alexiy (Алексiй, or Алексий in modern spelling), for its Saints and hierarchs (most notably, this is the form used for Patriarchs Alexius I and Alexius II).

The common hypocoristic is Alyosha or simply Lyosha. These may be further transformed into Alyoshka, Alyoshenka, Lyoshka, Lyoha, Lyoshenka (respectively), sometimes rendered as Alesha/Aleshenka in English. The form Alyosha may be used as a full first name in Bulgaria (Альоша) and Armenia. 

In theory, Alexia is the female form. It is, however, almost non-existent in Russian-speaking countries. A popular Russian, Ukrainian, and Belarusian female name Olesia/Olesya/Alesia/Alesya is one possible form.

The patronymics based on Alexey are Alexeyevich and Alexeev (male) and Alexeyevna and Alexeeva (female).  

The following surnames derive from Alexey and its various forms:
 Alexeyev/Alekseyev
 Alexeyevsky
 Alyoshin
 Alyokhin  (Alekhine, Alekhin)
 Lyoshin
 Alexeytsev/Alekseytsev /Alekseitsev 
 Alexeychuk/Alekseychuk/Alekseichuk 
 Alexeychik/Alekseychik/Alekseichik
 Alexeyuk/Alekseyuk
 Alexeyenko/Alekseyenko/Alekseenko
 Alexeychenko/Alekseychenko/Alekseichenko
 Alexievich

Alexeyevka is a common Russian village name.

Persons known by first name Alexey and variants

Alexis of Russia, Tsar of Russia from 1645 to 1676, son of Tsar Michael
Aleshenka, a rumored alien found in Russia
Grand Duke Alexei Alexandrovich of Russia, son of Tsar Alexander II
Alexey Andreevich Anselm, Russian theoretical physicist
Alexei Cherepanov (1989–2008), Russian hockey player
Alexei A. Efros, American computer scientist
Alexei L. Efros, American physicist
Alexey Goloborodko, Russian dancing contortionist
Alexey Goncharuk (Oleksiy Honcharuk), former Ukrainian prime minister
Aleksi Inauri (1908–1993), Soviet Georgian commander who headed the Georgian KGB
Alexei Ivanov (disambiguation), several people
Alexey Karamazov, fictional character from Fyodor Dostoyevsky's The Brothers Karamazov
Alexei Kovalev, Russian professional ice hockey player
Aleksei Yevgenyevich Kravchenko, Russian actor
Aleksey Kuleshov, Russian volleyball player
Alexei Leonov, pioneering Russian cosmonaut, first person to conduct a space walk
Alexei Makeyev (born 1991), Russian ice hockey player
Grand Duke Alexei Mikhailovich of Russia, grandson of Tsar Nicholas I
Alexei Navalny, Russian politician
Alexei Nemov, Russian Olympic gymnast
Alexei Nikolaevich, Tsarevich of Russia, the son of Nicholas II of Russia and Alexandra Feodorovna (Alix of Hesse) and younger brother of Grand Duchess Anastasia Nikolaevna of Russia
Alexey Pajitnov, inventor of the popular puzzle game Tetris
Tsarevich Alexei Petrovich of Russia, son of Peter I the Great
Alexei Ponikarovsky, Ukrainian-Canadian professional ice hockey player
Alexei Ramírez, Cuban baseball player
Alexey Rykov, Bolshevik revolutionary and Soviet politician
Alexei Savrasov, Russian artist
Alexei Sayle, English comedian and author
Alexei Shirov, Latvian-Spanish chess Grandmaster
Alexey Shved, Russian basketball player
Alexey Sorokin (disambiguation), several people
Aleksei Sytsevich, fictional character in the Marvel universe, better known as Rhino
Alexei Tezikov (1978–2020), Russian ice hockey player
Alexei Yagudin, Russian figure skater

See also 

 Alexi
 Aleksi
 Alexie

Masculine given names
Russian masculine given names